Roberto Roberti, O.P. or Roberto Vittori (1575–1624) was a Roman Catholic prelate who served as Bishop of Tricarico (1611–1624).

Biography
Roberto Roberti was born in Rome, Italy in 1575 and ordained a priest in the Order of Preachers.
On 5 Dec 1611, he was appointed during the papacy of Pope Paul V as Bishop of Tricarico.
On 8 Jan 1612, he was consecrated bishop by Giambattista Leni, Bishop of Ferrara, with Giovanni Canauli, Bishop of Fossombrone, and Antonio Ricci, Bishop of Arezzo, serving as co-consecrators. 
He served as Bishop of Tricarico until his death in Jan 1624.

References

External links and additional sources
 (for Chronology of Bishops) 
 (for Chronology of Bishops) 

17th-century Italian Roman Catholic bishops
Bishops appointed by Pope Paul V
1575 births
1624 deaths